The keyed trumpet is a cylindrical-bore brass instrument in the trumpet family that makes use of tone holes operated by keys to alter pitch and provide a full chromatic scale, rather than extending the length of tubing with a slide or valves. It was developed from the natural trumpet and reached its high-point in popularity around the turn of the nineteenth century, but waned with the invention of valves in the 1820s and the subsequent emergence of the modern valved trumpet. It is rarely seen in modern performances.

The keyed trumpet has raised tone holes in the wall of the tubing similar in construction to the later ophicleide or saxophone, closed by keys with pads. The experimental E keyed trumpet was not confined to the natural notes, but was chromatic in all registers of the instrument. Before this, the trumpet was commonly valveless and could only play a limited range of “harmonic” notes by altering the lip tension and embouchure, a group of instruments referred to as natural or baroque trumpets today. These harmonic notes were clustered in the high registers, so previous trumpet concertos could only play melodies at very high pitches.

There is also some discrepancy over who created the E keyed trumpet, as it is claimed that “the Viennese court trumpeter, Anton Weidinger invented the keyed trumpet” though elsewhere it is insisted that although “the invention of the keyed trumpet has been ascribed to the Viennese, Anton Weidinger, who is said to have constructed it in 1801... the instrument itself is older than that, as Haydn's concerto was written five years earlier.”

Tone

Due to its physical characteristics (bore, bell, historical mouthpiece), the keyed trumpet is closer in tone to the natural trumpet than the valved trumpet. It was once said to have sounded like a "Demented Oboe... despite Haydn's efforts, the keyed trumpet had no real success- the explanation may be that the holes detracted from the brilliant tone of the instrument.”

Concertos

J. Haydn – trumpet concerto

In 1796 Joseph Haydn wrote his Trumpet Concerto for Anton Weidinger and it was performed on 22 March 1800 at the Imperial and Royal Court Theatre. The piece begins with the broken triads and fanfare motifs common to trumpet music of the time (perhaps as a jibe to the audience who had come to see this exciting new kind of trumpet), but follows with chromatic runs and diatonic melodies not possible on the valveless natural trumpet.

The highest note in the Haydn trumpet concerto is high concert D, or high E on a B trumpet, or a high B on E trumpet for which it was written.

J. N. Hummel – trumpet concerto

Like Haydn, Johann Nepomuk Hummel wrote his Trumpet Concerto for Anton Weidinger.  It was written and performed in 1803 to mark his entrance into the Esterházy court orchestra in 1804, following Haydn.  There are places, primarily in the second movement, where Weidinger is believed to have changed the music because of the execution of the instrument.  It is unknown whether this was in agreement with Hummel.

Historical Usage 
The keyed trumpet did not remain as a mainstream instrument for much time in history. After the instrument was perfected in 1801, it remained in frequent use until the 1830s and 1840s when the valved trumpet replaced it. Its invention unlocked the chromatic scale for trumpet players, increasing the versatility of the instrument which facilitated its use to be a featured instrument in the orchestra rather than in the background. The Haydn Trumpet Concerto plays into this theme, being the first trumpet solo written in sonata-allegro form. Despite having unique overtone qualities not present in modern valved trumpets, the keyed trumpet has an inferior tone quality due to the holes drilled into the instrument; this inferior tone quality is what allowed the keyed trumpet to be surpassed by the valved trumpet.

Modern Usage 
There are few people that play the keyed trumpet today, and its use is generally in a historical performance setting. Modern experts on the keyed trumpet include Markus Wuersch, Mark Bennett and Barry Bauguess; given that there are few people who can play this specialized instrument, performances are rare and almost exclusively performances of the Haydn or Hummel Trumpet Concertos. The argument for using keyed trumpets in the modern day is that you get the distinct tone qualities of the instrument. Keyed trumpets have a rich, overtone filled sound due to them being double the length of the modern trumpet. Today, orchestral music is seeing a push to return to period instruments in order to preserve the compositions in the way the composer intended. This push is what has caused instrument makers like Konrad Burri to revisit and produce period instruments like the keyed trumpet in the modern day.

Performances 
Although performances using the keyed trumpet are rare, there are a few recordings that can be listened to:
 Mark Bennett, Haydn Trumpet Concerto with The English Concert (1990)
 Markus Würsch, Hummel Trumpet Concerto (2016)

Extended Repertoire 
Below is a list of pieces originally written to have keyed trumpet:

Sigismund Neukomm - Requiem (with keyed trumpet interludes) - 1815

Antonio Casimir Cartellieri - Polonaise in A - 1815

Johann Nepomuk Hummel - Trio for pianoforte, violin and trumpet. (possibly the influence for Rondo from Hummel’s trumpet concerto) - 1802

Joseph Weigl - Concerto in E flat for Corno Inglese, Flauto d’amore, Tromba, Viola d’amore, Cembalo and Violoncello - 1799

Leopold Kozeluch - Concertante in E flat major for mandolin, keyed trumpet, double bass, pianoforte and orchestra - 1798

See also
Natural trumpet for more information on the keyed trumpet's predecessor
Piston valve for a description of more modern trumpets and how they work
Trumpet for a more detailed history on the trumpet's evolution through time

References

External links
Keyed trumpets in the Joe R. and Joella F. Utley Collection of Brass Instruments at the National Music Museum
thekeyedtrumpet.co.uk  - a website dedicated to the keyed trumpet

E-flat instruments
Trumpets